Gerard of Brussels was an early thirteenth-century geometer and philosopher known primarily for his Latin book Liber de motu (On Motion), which was a pioneering study in kinematics, probably written between 1187 and 1260. It has been described as "the first Latin treatise that was to take the fundamental approach to kinematics that was to characterize modern kinematics." He brought the works of Euclid and Archimedes back into popularity and was a direct influence on the Oxford Calculators (four kinematicists of Merton College) in the next century. Gerard is cited by Thomas Bradwardine in his Tractatus de proportionibus velocitatum (1328). His chief contribution was in moving away from Greek mathematics and closer to the notion of "a ratio of two unlike quantities such as distance and time", which is how modern physics defines velocity.

Modern editions
Clagett, Marshall. "The Liber de motu of Gerard of Brussels and the Origins of Kinematics in the West," Osiris, 12(1956):73–175.

References

External links
Kinematics in the 13th and 14th Centuries by Teun Koetsier. Abstract: The paper deals with kinematical work by Gerard of Brussels, the Merton College group, Casali and Oresme. 

13th-century philosophers
Geometers
13th-century mathematicians
13th-century Latin writers
Medieval physicists
People from the Duchy of Brabant